Alain Carignon (born 23 February 1949 in Vizille (Isère), is a conservative French politician. From 1986 to 1995, he was deputy to the National Assembly, before becoming a junior minister in charge of environmental issues in the second Chirac government; in 1986 he proposed legislation against major radioactive risks. He then became minister in charge of media and telecommunication in the Balladur government., but had to resign from that position when his indictment for corruption became inevitable. He was later sentenced to a 4 years jail term, and made unelectable for a further 5 years. He served 29 months of his jail sentence, the longest to date for a French politician convicted of corruption.

He returned to political activity in 2002 at the end of his unelectability term, and has since unsuccessfully run for several elected positions.

References

External links 
 official website
 biographical article at l'Assemblée nationale

1949 births
Living people
People from Isère
Politicians from Auvergne-Rhône-Alpes
Rally for the Republic politicians
Union for a Popular Movement politicians
Government ministers of France
Deputies of the 8th National Assembly of the French Fifth Republic
Deputies of the 9th National Assembly of the French Fifth Republic
Deputies of the 10th National Assembly of the French Fifth Republic
Mayors of Grenoble
French politicians convicted of crimes
French politicians convicted of corruption